The Boulevard Auguste-Blanqui is a boulevard in the 13th arrondissement of Paris. It is one of the main arteries linking the Place d'Italie with the Place Denfert-Rochereau.

The boulevard is 1040 metres long, and approximately 70 metres wide, it starts from the Place d'Italie and extends to Rue de la Santé, on the edge of the 14th arrondissement, where it becomes the Boulevard Saint-Jacques. It traverses the former valley of the Bièvre.

The boulevard is named after the French thinker and socialist revolutionary Louis Auguste Blanqui (1805–1881).

History
The boulevard occupies the site of the ancient Wall of the Farmers-General. Originally, the roadways ran alongside the wall, which was knocked down in the 1860s.

Their former names were :
on the outside was the Boulevard d'Italie between Place d'Italie and Rue de la Glacière,
but which became the Boulevard de la Glacière beyond Rue de la Glacière,
on the inside was Boulevard des Gobelins between Place d'Italie and Rue de la Glacière (as distinct from the Avenue des Gobelins which also starts from the Place d'Italie)
but which became Boulevard Saint-Jacques beyond Rue de la Glacière.

Central reservation
The central reservation of the boulevard lies directly underneath the entire width of the overhead line 6. At its junction with Rue de la Glacière, there is a basketball court, and a "boulodrome", for playing boules close to the Corvisart métro station.

Notable addresses 
Close to the Place d'Italie, is a memorial dedicated to the "Children of the 13th arrondissement who died for France."
 18, Boulevard Auguste-Blanqui – École Estienne, the Graduate School of Arts and Printing Industry.

External links

 
 Official nomenclature of Parisian roads 

Auguste-Blanqui
Auguste-Blanqui